Cyrina Fiallo (born December 29, 1991) is an American actress. She is perhaps best known for her recurring role as Vonnie on the Disney Channel sitcom Good Luck Charlie. She also has guest starred on Everybody Hates Chris, Community, Gigantic, Glee, Switched at Birth, Girl Meets World  and Supernatural. She also starred in the internet television series My Alibi and The Subpranos, the latter of which she co-wrote, co-directed and co-produced with fellow actress Chrissie Fit.

Born in Miami, Florida, she is of Cuban and Italian descent. She is also a member of the cover group The Girls, alongside fellow actresses Alison Brie and Julianna Guill.

She has appeared in numerous TV commercials for various retailers, such as Allstate, Booking.com, Capital One, Pepsi, Samsung, and Subaru.

Filmography

References

External links

21st-century American actresses
Actresses from Miami
American film actresses
American people of Cuban descent
American people of Italian descent
American television actresses
Living people
1991 births